Muhammad Saeed Wazir is a Pakistani civil servant and a Police officer who is currently serving as Inspector General of Gilgit-Baltistan Police since March 2021.

Wazi belongs to Wāṇa, South Waziristan, Khyber Pakhtunkhwa. He has also served in Punjab Police, Khyber Pakhtunkhwa Police, Balochistan Police and as well as the National Highways and Motorway Police.

References

Inspector Generals of Gilgit-Baltistan Police
Living people
Pakistani police officers
People from South Waziristan
Year of birth missing (living people)